Boyo is a village located in the Central African Republic prefecture of Ouaka.

History 
On 15 May 2021 Russian mercenaries from Wagner Group took control of Boyo after clashes with UPC rebels during which around 20 people were killed. It was recaptured by UPC militiamen on 12 June.

On 6 and 7 December militiamen belonging to the pro-government faction of Anti-balaka attacked Boyo killing around 15 civilians and displacing more than thousand people. On 25 December MINUSCA peacekeepers launched operation in Boyo forcing around 200 UPC fighters to withdraw. On 6 January 2022 Deputy Special Representative of the Secretary General of the United Nations and Humanitarian Coordinator, Denise Brown accompanied by the humanitarian community went on a mission in Boyo. She met with victims of violence in the community. They said that armed men stole seeds and farming equipment making it harder for civilians to grow crops.

References 

Populated places in Ouaka